The  Bank of Gueydan, located at 214 Main St. in Gueydan in Vermilion Parish, Louisiana, was built in 1902.  It was listed on the National Register of Historic Places in 1990.

It is Romanesque Revival in style.

It is a two-story masonry commercial building with two well-preserved arcaded exterior faces onto the two streets of its corner location.

References

Bank buildings on the National Register of Historic Places in Louisiana
Romanesque Revival architecture in Louisiana
Commercial buildings completed in 1902
Vermilion Parish, Louisiana